The Department of Music at California State University is a conservatory in Los Angeles, California. There are more than 500 students pursuing undergraduate and graduate degrees in music.

The Music Department at the California State University, Northridge offers studying and performing opportunities in connection with the leading educational institutions and cultural venues of the Los Angeles area.

Faculty
 Gregg Bissonette, drums
 John Dearman, guitar
 Scott Glasgow, film and media composition
 Liviu Marinescu, composition
 Bob McChesney, jazz trombone
 John Pisano, jazz guitar
 Ron Purcell, guitar
 Andrew Surmani, music industry studies
 Steven Thachuk guitar

Areas of study
Bachelor of Arts

 Music Industry Studies
 Music Therapy
 Breadth Studies in Music
 Music Education

Bachelor of Music

 Commercial & Media Composition
 Composition
 Strings
 Woodwinds
 Brass
 Percussion
 Piano
 Voice
 Jazz Performance
 Classical Guitar

Master of Arts
 Music education
Master of Music

 Conducting
 Composition
 Strings
 Woodwinds
 Brass
 Percussion
 Piano
 Organ
 Voice
 Classical Guitar

Notable alumni

Brass
Ronnie Blake trumpet
Tony Clements tuba
Jeff Purtle trumpet

Composition
Beverly Grigsby composer
Kentaro Sato Media and Commercial Music / Conducting (MA)
George Stone (composer) composer
Jeannie G. Pool composer
Garrett Byrnes composer
Stephen Cohn composer
John Coda composer

Percussion
Kalani percussion
Alphonse Mouzon percussion

Piano
Gordon Goodwin piano

Strings
Ron Purcell classical guitar
Robert Lipsett violin
John Doan guitar
Bruce Bransby bass

Voice
Michelle DeYoung voice
James Fortune voice
Maia Sharp voice
Nicole Cabell voice

Woodwinds
Vicki Boeckman recorder, flute
D. Scott Rogo oboe

Jazz
Alphonso Johnson bass
Kim Pensyl keyboard
Richard Campbell bass guitar
John Densmore jazz studies
Michael Glenn Williams composer, pianist
Masauko Chipembere Jr jazz studies

Other
Toshiyuki Shimada conductor
Paul Roessler singer
Sebu Simonian singer-songwriter 
Leland Sklar singer, film composer
James Lee Stanley singer-songwriter
Tigran Arakelyan conductor

References

 https://web.archive.org/web/20111007161637/http://amc.csun.edu/
 https://web.archive.org/web/20110819093714/http://www.csunmusictherapy.org/index.htm
 http://www.kcsn.org/

External links
 http://www.csun.edu/music/

CSU Northridge
M
Music, CSU Northridge